Parliamentary elections are scheduled to be held in Chad in 2024.

Background
The last parliamentary term that began in June 2011 was originally scheduled to end in June 2015, but was extended. President Idriss Déby announced on 2 February 2017 that the election would be delayed because the government did not have sufficient funds in the midst of an economic slump: "When we have resources, we can hold parliamentary elections". He also urged the opposition to engage in dialogue and "stop cultivating hatred that results in dividing the country".

In June 2017, members of the FONAC opposition coalition argued that the National Assembly became illegitimate by continuing to sit beyond 21 June, two years after the extension of the parliamentary term, and that deputies from the opposition should consequently resign. Opposition deputies led by Saleh Kebzabo responded that they would not resign, feeling that it would be more "useful" for them to remain in the National Assembly; however, they also said that the next election should be held promptly, dismissing Déby's view that the delay was necessary due to a lack of funds, and that in the future the government should make every effort to hold elections on time.

The election was later rescheduled to November 2018. When this deadline too was not met, a new one of May 2019 was proposed by the government. The new National Independent Elections Commission (CENI) was sworn in by the Supreme Court on 4 April 2019 despite protests by segments of the opposition regarding its impartiality. On 5 April, the Coordination des Partis Politiques pour la Défense de la Constitution (CPDC) comprising a dozen opposition parties controlling 31 seats in the 188-seat National Assembly rejected the swearing-in, calling it "illegally constituted, null and void and of no effect." The country's election board said “the realistic time frame for holding legislative elections is the first quarter of 2020”. At the beginning of that year a date was set for 9 August 2020, shortly thereafter amended to 13 December, citing increased attacks by Boko Haram around Lake Chad. With the COVID-19 pandemic the election was postponed yet again to April, then October, 2021, and later September 2022. The junta later announced a further postponement of elections for two years, scheduling elections for around October of 2024.

Electoral system
The 188 members of the National Assembly are elected from 116 constituencies. Constituencies with a population of over 50,000 have two members, with an additional member for every additional 40,000 residents. In constituencies with one seat, the two-round system is used. In multi-member constituencies, a party winning over 50% of the vote wins all the seats; if no party wins over 50% of the vote, seats are allocated proportionally using the highest averages method.

Results

References

Elections in Chad
Chad
Parliamentary election
Elections postponed due to the COVID-19 pandemic